Cophyla is a genus of microhylid frogs endemic to Madagascar.

Species
The following species are recognised in the genus Cophyla:
 Cophyla alticola (Guibé, 1974)
 Cophyla ando (Scherz, Köhler, Vences, and Glaw, 2019)
 Cophyla barbouri (Noble, 1940)
 Cophyla berara Vences, Andreone, and Glaw, 2005
 Cophyla cowanii (Boulenger, 1882)
 Cophyla fortuna Rakotoarison, Scherz, Bletz, Razafindraibe, Glaw, and Vences, 2019
 Cophyla grandis (Boulenger, 1889)
 Cophyla karenae (Rosa, Crottini, Noel, Rabibisoa, Raxworthy, and Andreone, 2014)
Cophyla laetus (Rakotoarison, Scherz, Köhler, Ratsoavina, Hawlitschek, Megson, Vences & Glaw, 2020)
 Cophyla maharipeo Rakotoarison, Crottini, Müller, Rödel, Glaw, and Vences, 2015
 Cophyla mavomavo (Andreone, Fenolio, and Walvoord, 2003)
 Cophyla milloti (Guibé, 1950)
 Cophyla noromalalae Rakotoarison, Crottini, Müller, Rödel, Glaw, and Vences, 2015
 Cophyla occultans (Glaw and Vences, 1992)
 Cophyla olgae (Rakotoarison, Glaw, Vieites, Raminosoa, and Vences, 2012)
 Cophyla phyllodactyla Boettger, 1880
 Cophyla pollicaris (Boulenger, 1888)
 Cophyla puellarum Rakotoarison, Crottini, Müller, Rödel, Glaw, and Vences, 2015
 Cophyla rava (Glaw, Köhler, and Vences, 2012)
 Cophyla tetra (Andreone, Fenolio, and Walvoord, 2003)
 Cophyla tsaratananaensis Guibé, 1974
 Cophyla tuberifera (Methuen, 1920)

References

 
Microhylidae
Cophylinae
Endemic frogs of Madagascar
Amphibian genera
Taxa named by Oskar Boettger